CSSD may refer to:
Royal Central School of Speech and Drama, London, England
Central sterile services department, an integrated place in health-care facilities that performs sterilization of medical devices
Cloneproof Schwartz Sequential Dropping, a single-winner election method
Computer Supported Spiritual Development, a field of study related to computer-supported collaboration
Czech Social Democratic Party, Česká strana sociálně demokratická, ČSSD
Department of Children, Seniors and Social Development (Newfoundland and Labrador), child protection agency in Newfoundland, Canada